Marshfield is a town in Washington County, Vermont, United States. The population was 1,583 at the 2020 census.

History

The town was named for Captain Isaac Marsh, who bought the original town site.

Geography
According to the United States Census Bureau, the town has a total area of 43.4 square miles (112.4 km2), of which 43.1 square miles (111.6 km2, 99.29%) is land and 0.3 square miles (0.8 km2, 0.71%) is water.

Demographics

As of the census of 2000, there were 1,496 people, 575 households, and 416 families residing in the town. The population density was 34.7 people per square mile (13.4/km2). There were 686 housing units at an average density of 15.9 per square mile (6.1/km2). The racial makeup of the town was 96.86% White, 0.74% Black or African American, 0.13% Native American, 0.40% Asian, 0.20% from other races, and 1.67% from two or more races. Hispanic or Latino of any race were 0.67% of the population.

There were 575 households, out of which 39.5% had children under the age of 18 living with them, 56.5% were couples living together and joined in either marriage or civil union, 9.6% had a female householder with no husband present, and 27.5% were non-families. 20.9% of all households were made up of individuals, and 5.0% had someone living alone who was 65 years of age or older. The average household size was 2.60 and the average family size was 3.01.

In the town, the population was spread out, with 27.9% under the age of 18, 6.6% from 18 to 24, 30.4% from 25 to 44, 26.1% from 45 to 64, and 9.0% who were 65 years of age or older. The median age was 38 years. For every 100 females, there were 102.4 males.  For every 100 females age 18 and over, there were 102.6 males.

The median income for a household in the town was $40,603, and the median income for a family was $44,063. Males had a median income of $30,852 versus $25,823 for females. The per capita income for the town was $18,649. About 8.0% of families and 9.1% of the population were below the poverty line, including 14.1% of those under age 18 and 5.8% of those age 65 or over.

Notable people

 Andrew Perchlik, member of the Vermont Senate
 Levi P. Powers, Wisconsin legislator and judge, was born in the town
 Dave Rogers, NASCAR Crew Chief leader for Daniel Suarez

Movie
Portions of the 1983 film adaptation of Robert Cormier's novel I Am the Cheese were filmed in Marshfield.

References

External links
 

 
Towns in Vermont
Towns in Washington County, Vermont